Highway 29, known locally as Don Philips Way, is a shortcut route from the John Hart Highway to the Alaska Highway in the Peace River Regional District.  It is also the main access to the coal mining community of Tumbler Ridge, as well as the W. A. C. Bennett Dam facility near Hudson's Hope.  The highway gained its '29' designation from Chetwynd north to Hudson's Hope in 1967, and then seventeen years later, the road from Chetwynd south to Tumbler Ridge was given the same number.

Route details
In Tumbler Ridge, the 237 km (147 mi) long Highway 29 starts at a junction with Highway 52, and travels north northwest for 94 km (58 mi) to its junction with the John Hart Highway at Chetwynd. It follows the John Hart Highway through Chetwynd for 3 km (2 mi) east, then turns northwest for 65 km (40 mi) past Moberly Lake to Hudson's Hope, where a connector road to the W. A. C. Bennett Dam begins. 75 km (47 mi) northeast of Hudson's Hope, Highway 29 finally meets the Alaska Highway north of Fort St. John near Charlie Lake.

Major intersections
From south to north. The entire route is in the Peace River Regional District.

External links
 Official Numbered Routes in British Columbia by British Columbia Driving & Transportation

References 

029